RF monitor software is a software which (with special hardware as a WiFi-card) is able to detect signal strength and bit error rate of wireless networks. The software includes network discovery software programs as KIsmet and Network stumbler, yet these latter provide much more information about the network itself, and are not as precise as true RF monitor software. The extra precision is especially useful in cooperation with a directional antenna (e.g. cantennas).

References

Hacking (computer security)
Wireless networking